State Route 241 (SR 241) is a north–south state highway in the northeastern portion of the U.S. state of Ohio.  Its southern terminus is at U.S. Route 62 in Millersburg, and its northern terminus is at State Route 18 in Akron.

History
SR 241 was commissioned in 1924, between Massillon and Akron. The route was extended south to Millersburg in 1937. In 2009 the northern terminus was changed from Massillon Road to Seiberling Street and Innovation Way in Akron.

Major intersections

References

External links

241
Transportation in Holmes County, Ohio
Transportation in Stark County, Ohio
Transportation in Wayne County, Ohio
Transportation in Summit County, Ohio